Guarea cristata is a species of plant in the family Meliaceae. It is found in Brazil and Peru.

References

cristata
Vulnerable plants
Taxonomy articles created by Polbot